Tempting Heart is a 1999 movie, directed and co-written by Sylvia Chang, starring Takeshi Kaneshiro and Gigi Leung as a pair of onscreen lovers.

The film has a notable theme song "Xin Dong", performed by Shino Lin Xiao Pei. This song became a radio hit and can still be frequently heard on the radio or at karaoke bars/boxes.

The success of this film prompted director Johnnie To to cast Gigi Leung and Takeshi Kaneshiro in his 2003 film Turn Left Turn Right.

Plot

Sylvia Chang plays a director who intends to make a romance film and begins to wonder about the role fate plays in relationships. She ends up re-examining her own first love in a completely different light. The story is set in two different periods of time, one in the 1970s where Gigi plays the teenage Xiao-rou, and the other in the 1990s where Sylvia plays the older Xiao-rou.

Takeshi Kaneshiro plays the role of a shy teenager, Ho-jun, who falls in love with Xiao-rou (played by Gigi Leung). Their relationship turns intimate but faces fierce objections from their parents. Karen Mok plays Chen-li, Xiao-rou's best friend, whom Xiao-rou confides in.

This teenage love soon fizzles out owing to misunderstandings and Ho-jun, after many years, turns to marry Chen-li. One day, Chen-li reveals that she is a lesbian and that they both love the same girl - Xiao-rou.

Ho-jun meets Xiao-rou on a trip to Japan and upon knowing that Ho-jun is already married, Xiao-rou returns home and gets herself engaged. Ho-jun manages a last attempt to reunite with Xiao-rou by flying to Hong Kong and telling her that he is already a divorcee, but it is to no avail.

Years later, Xiao-rou finds out that Ho-jun's wife was actually Chen-li. She discovers this only after Chen-li has died. Chen-li leaves a message for Xiao-rou asking her for forgiveness. As Xiao rou prepares to fly back to Hong Kong from Japan, she receives a present from Ho-jun. In the box were photographs, taken when Ho-jun was thinking about Xiao-rou and of their brief moments of happiness.

It is only at the end of the film when it is tactfully revealed that the director Sylvia Chang was actually re-enacting her own teenage romance.

Cast
 Takeshi Kaneshiro - Ho-jun
 Gigi Leung - Sheo-rou (Xiao-rou)
 Karen Mok - Chen-Li
 Sylvia Chang - Cheryl
 Leon Dai - Ho-jun (middle age)
 Elaine Jin - Sheo-rou's mom
 Jo Kuk
 Audrey Mak
 William So - Screenwriter
 Michael Tong
 Cher Yeung

See also
 List of Hong Kong films

External links
 
 HK Cinemagic entry

1990s romance films
1999 films
Hong Kong LGBT-related films
Lesbian-related films
Self-reflexive films
Films directed by Sylvia Chang
1990s Hong Kong films